The Young Sinner may refer to:

 The Young Sinner (1960 film), a West German drama film
 Like Father, Like Son (1961 film), also known as The Young Sinner, an American film